Johannes Waitz, also Hans Waitz, was a German Biblical scholar specializing in the New Testament Apocrypha and source-critical studies. He was an Evangelical pastor in Darmstadt until 1927, and not to be confused with the Austrian Catholic bishop of the same name.

He was the advocate of a Petrine source text for Acts 8:5-25. and attempted to identify Papyrus Oxyrhynchus 840 as part of the lost Gospel of the Nazarenes. Waitz was the first to recognize parallel accounts in the two major pseudo-Clementines and postulated a "basic document" dated to the third century.

Works 
 Das Johannesevangelium  Darmstadt  1887
 Das Pseudotertullianische Gedicht Adversus Marcionem  1901
 Judenchristliche Evangelien in ed. Edgar Hennecke Neutestamentliche Apokryphen 1904
 Geschichte des Wingolfsbundes  Darmstadt  1904
 Texte Und Untersuchungen Zur Geschichte Der Altchristlichen Literatur: Volume 25
 Das Evangelium der zwolf Apostel ZNW 1 3 (1912): 338–48; 14 (1913):

References 

Year of birth missing
German biblical scholars
New Testament scholars
Year of death missing